Dìng'ān (postal: Tingan) is an administrative district in Hainan, People's Republic of China. It is one of 4 counties of Hainan. In 1999 its population was 304,522 people.

The town of Dingcheng is the main population center.

Climate

See also

 List of administrative divisions of Hainan

References

 

Ding'an County